The Renault Master is a large van produced by the French manufacturer Renault since 1980, now in its third generation. It replaced the earlier Renault Super Goélette light trucks.  Opel has sold versions of the second and third series vans as the Opel Movano in Continental Europe and Vauxhall Movano in the United Kingdom. All three generations have been designed and manufactured by Renault, irrespective of the brand.

Over its lifetime, several different body styles have been available, from the standard van to bigger models with an increased load area, height, and longer wheelbases with an LWB prefix. Panel vans are very common, but pickups are also available. Heavier duty models of the Master were also sold by (now Volvo owned) Renault Trucks as the B series, later as the Messenger and the Mascott.



First generation (1980) 

The original Renault Master was launched in September 1980. Originally launched with the  Fiat-Sofim diesel engine, and from 1984 also with the  power unit. In rare cases the Master was sold with a 2.0 L or 2.2 L Renault petrol engine.

In 1990, a marginally larger (2499 cc) version of the Sofim diesel replaced the earlier version.

They competed with a number of other manufacturer's products, and completed Renault's commercial range, after the Dodge 50 Series, which was latterly being built as the Renault 50 Series, after Renault's acquisition of the  Dodge production facilities in the United Kingdom (at the time of Peugeot's takeover of Chrysler Europe).

The smaller Renault Trafic was also launched in 1980, resulting in a large range of light commercial vehicles.

The Master was distinctively styled with the sliding door design and unusual round door handles, similar to those of the Fiat Ritmo/Strada. The van was manufactured at Renault's then new SoVAB Batilly plant in northeastern France.

Renault B series / Messenger 

An alternative heavier duty version which appeared almost identical, was sold by Renault Trucks as the Renault B70 to B120. It first appeared as the  B70 (diesel) and as the  B80 (petrol) in the end of 1982. It was a light truck with a Renault Master I body on a separate chassis, with rear wheel drive and rear dual wheels.

The B series was offered with a range of alternative body options. As the Master (and the smaller Trafic) both carried manufacturer's plates from Renault's automobile division, RVI's production numbers appeared to plummet as the SG2 and SG3 were gradually replaced. It was introduced in the United Kingdom in 1990, gradually replacing the previous Chrysler Europe-developed Dodge/Renault 50 series.

It was thus decided in 1982 to transfer the new, heavier B series range to RVI. More powerful versions were gradually added, incorporating turbochargers and intercooling.

Although a 4x4 version of the B90 took part in the Paris Dakar Rally in 1987, the "civilian" version of the B90 4x4 truck was unveiled in 1990 only, and was sold until 1999. In 1993, the B series had a grille change and was renamed Messenger. It was replaced by the Renault Mascott.

Second generation (1997) 

The second generation Renault Master, which arrived in November 1997, was more conventional in appearance and, though primarily developed by Renault, was available from 1998 as the almost identical Opel Movano (badged in the United Kingdom as the Vauxhall Movano), and from Renault's closely related partner Nissan, from whom it was available as the Nissan Interstar from 1999.

This arrangement mirrors the collaboration between these companies on the Master's smaller counterpart, the Renault Trafic; within the industry, similar platform sharing arrangements existed between Fiat and Peugeot/Citroën, and also between Volkswagen and Mercedes.

The second generation of the Renault Master and the third generation of the Iveco Daily share many panels and some components of the cab, including the doors due to an agreement between Iveco and Renault stipulated in July 1994.

The agreement provided for the production and sharing of common components for a total of 120 thousand pieces a year produced in the various factories of Brescia (Italy, Iveco), Suzzara (Italy, Iveco), Valladolid (Spain, Iveco) and Batilly (France, Renault factory).

The Master used the Renault S-Type engine in S9U and S8W/S9W versions, the G-Type engine (G9T) and the Nissan YD engine. Displacements available (not across all chassis/body sizes) included 2.2, 2.5, and 2.8 litres with a range of power outputs.

The van received a mid life major facelift in the end of 2003, with the headlight area being heavily restyled (together with cosmetic changes to rear lights, wing mirrors, and dashboard), resulting in the front end somewhat resembling the smaller Trafic. Like its predecessor, the van was available in a number of sizes and configurations, and was a popular base for conversion to ambulance bodywork.

For the facelifted Master, the 2.8 litre engine option was replaced in some markets with the 3.0 litre ZD3 engine derived from the Nissan ZD30 engine, variants ZD3 200 or 202 for transverse mount front wheel drive arrangements and variants; 600, 604, 606 or 608 for rear wheel drive arrangements. The grille was redesigned in 2007 on Renault-badged models.

Renault Mascott 

Renault Trucks marketed a heavy duty 3.0 L diesel version of the Master with rear-wheel drive and sold it as the Mascott. Other names for this version are: Master Propulsion (France and others), and Master Pro (The Netherlands).

It retained the name Master in Albania, Bosnia and Herzegovina, Croatia, Macedonia, and Slovenia, Master LDT in Belgium, Master Maxi in Poland, and Master Propulsion in Spain, France, Italy, and Réunion. Available in Europe between 1999 and 2013, it was positioned between the Master and the larger Renault Midlum.

Third generation (2010) 

A new generation of the Renault Master was introduced in the summer of 2010, again including the rebadged Opel/Vauxhall Movano and Nissan NV400. It is the first time that either the Opel/Vauxhall or Nissan has been available with single/twin rear wheel drive.

Renault Trucks discontinued the Mascott and sold the third generation Master in chassis cab format only, with payloads of up to 2.5 tonnes.

In 2014, the front grille was facelifted on the Renault Master but the facelift did not apply to the Opel/Vauxhall versions. On 18 April 2016, Renault announced starting producing an off-road version of the Renault Master, with a four-wheel drive layout.

In South Korea, FF Layout Master L1H1(S) and L2H2(L) panel van were launched on 15 October 2018. They are imported from France. The first Master in South Korean market will be diesel with manual gearbox. Short version trim(S)'s price are 29,000,000won, Long body van(L)'s price are 31,000,000won. Renault Korea possibly consider the competitors as the Hyundai Starex and Hyundai H350.

In 2019, a facelifted model was introduced for the 2020 model year.

In 2021, the Opel/Vauxhall Movano was discontinued due to the partnership of Opel/Vauxhall with Group PSA, now known as Stellantis, and replaced with a new Movano, based on the Fiat Ducato.

In 2022, the Nissan version reverted back to using the Interstar name.

Notes

Master Z.E. and E-Tech

The Master Z.E. was introduced in 2018 as a battery electric vehicle with a 33 kW-hr lithium ion battery and the  "R75" electric traction motor from the contemporaneous Zoe and Kangoo Z.E., providing a driving range of  under the WLTP cycle. In the UK, the newer variant with larger range now is marketed as the Master E-Tech instead. It will go on sale in the Australian market in 2024.

The battery can be recharged at 7.4 kW (AC); the newer 52 kW-hr variant adds the ability to use a DC charger, but is limited to 22 kW.

Master Van H2-Tech
At the 2022 Paris Motor Show, HYVIA presented a production version of the Renault Master Van H2-TECH, which runs on hydrogen.

References 

Master
Vans
Electric vans
Vehicles introduced in 1980
Cars of Brazil